Roslevan is a residential area on the eastern side of Ennis, County Clare, Ireland. The area has many housing estates such as Oakleigh Wood, Cappahard, Corrovorin. There are two council housing estates in the area, called, Bridgecourt and Bridgeview. It is expected that by 2012 the area will have a population of 7,000.

The Area includes the €10 million Roslevan Shopping Centre which opened in April 2005. The shopping centre includes a butcher, pharmacy, Off Licence, pub, bookmakers, Chinese restaurant, gym and a Costcutter supermarket.

A development in the area that is underway includes  of parkland with lakes, riverside walks and woodlands included.

Primary education is mainly provided by Knockanean National School in nearby Knockanean, and by various other primary schools in Ennis.

Roman Catholic Church

See also
 Cloughleigh
 List of towns and villages in Ireland

References

Ennis
Articles on towns and villages in Ireland possibly missing Irish place names